Mary Ann Love (February 21, 1940 – January 27, 2022) was an American politician from Maryland and a member of the Democratic Party. She served 4 full terms in the Maryland House of Delegates, representing Maryland's District 32. Love was originally appointed to the seat in 1993, but was later elected in her own right. She most recently served on the Economic Matters Committee. Love declined to run for reelection in 2014.

Early life
Mary Ann was born in West Pittston, Pennsylvania on February 21, 1940. She graduated from St. John's High School in 1958. She attended the Wilkes-Barre Business School.

Career

Legislative Notes
 voted in favor of increasing the sales tax by from 5% to 6% - Tax Reform Act of 2007(HB2)
 voted to support in-state tuition for all graduates of a Maryland public high school, 2007(HB6)
 voted for the Maryland Gang Prosecution Act of 2007 (HB713), subjecting gang members to up to 20 years in prison and/or a fine of up to $100,000 
 voted for Jessica's Law (HB 930), eliminating parole for the most violent child sexual predators and creating a mandatory minimum sentence of 25 years in state prison, 2007 
 voted for Public Safety – Statewide DNA Database System – Crimes of Violence and Burglary – Post conviction (HB 370), helping to give police officers and prosecutors greater resources to solve crimes and eliminating a backlog of 24,000 unanalyzed DNA samples, leading to 192 arrests, 2008 
 voted for Vehicle Laws – Repeated Drunk and Drugged Driving Offenses – Suspension of License (HB 293), strengthening Maryland's drunk driving laws by imposing a mandatory one year license suspension for a person convicted of drunk driving more than once in five years, 2009 
 voted for HB 102, creating the House Emergency Medical Services System Workgroup, leading to Maryland's budgeting of $52 million to fund three new Medevac helicopters to replace the State's aging fleet, 2009 
 voted in 2013 in favor of gun control legislation (SB 281) banning certain firearms and placing significant new restrictions on the ability of law-abiding citizens to own firearms

Election results
2002 Race for Maryland House of Delegates – District 32
Voters to choose three:
{| class="wikitable"
|-
!Name
!Votes
!Percent
!Outcome
|-
|-
|James E. Rzepkowski, Rep.
|18,299
|  19.84%
|   Won
|-
|-
|Theodore Sophocleus, Dem.
|16,842
|  18.26%
|   Won
|-
|-
|Mary Ann Love, Dem.
|16,646
|  18.05%
|   Won
|-
|-
|Robert G. Pepersack, Sr, Rep.
|14,628
|  15.86%
|   Lost
|-
|-
|Victor A. Sulin, Dem.
|13,694
|  14.85%
|   Lost
|-
|-
|David P. Starr, Rep.
|12,020
|  13.04%
|   Lost
|-
|Other Write-Ins
|82
|  0.09%
|   Lost
|}

1998 Race for Maryland House of Delegates – District 32
Voters to choose three:
{| class="wikitable"
|-
!Name
!Votes
!Percent
!Outcome
|-
|-
|Mary Ann Love, Dem.
|15,823
|  19%
|   Won
|-
|-
|Theodore Sophocleus, Dem.
|15,382
|  18%
|   Won
|-
|-
|James E. Rzepkowski, Rep.
|14,959
|  18%
|   Won
|-
|-
|Michael W. Burns, Rep.
|13,247
|  16%
|   Lost
|-
|-
|Victor Sulin, Dem.
|12,658
|  15%
|   Lost
|-
|-
|Betty Ann O'Neill, Dem.
|11,752
|  14%
|   Lost
|-
|}

1994 Race for Maryland House of Delegates – District 32
Voters to choose three:
{| class="wikitable"
|-
!Name
!Votes
!Percent
!Outcome
|-
|-
|James E. Rzepkowski, Rep.
|15,147
|  20%
|   Won
|-
|-
|Michael W. Burns, Rep.
|12,883
|  17%
|   Won
|-
|-
|Mary Ann Love, Dem.
|12,414
|  16%
|   Won
|-
|-
|Gerald P. Starr, Rep.
|12,166
|  16%
|   Lost
|-
|-
|Victor A. Sulin, Dem.
|11,872
|  16%
|   Lost
|-
|-
|Thomas H. Dixon III, Dem.
|11,002
|  15%
|   Lost
|-
|}

Death

Love died on January 27, 2022, aged 81.

References

1940 births
2022 deaths
Democratic Party members of the Maryland House of Delegates
People from Anne Arundel County, Maryland
Women state legislators in Maryland
21st-century American politicians
21st-century American women politicians